The Iranian ambassador in Islamabad is the official representative of the Government in Tehran to the Government of Pakistan.

List of representatives

See also
Iran–Pakistan relations

References 

 
Pakistan
Iran